M-7 highway (previously known as M-6 highway) is a Montenegrin roadway.

History
The M-7, then known as M-6, highway was built in 1981.

It was built as part of the larger M-6 highway within the Yugoslav highway network, spanning Slovenia, Croatia, Bosnia and Herzegovina and Montenegro. It connected Nikšić with Trebinje in Bosnia and Herzegovina; Gospić, Knin and Sinj in Croatia; Škofljica and Kočevje in Slovenia .

Since 2013 sections of the highway have been reconstructed by increasing curve radii and adding third lane on steeper sections. In 2017, 13 kilometers are reconstructed with 3.7 with added third lane.   

In January 2016, the Ministry of Transport and Maritime Affairs published bylaw on categorisation of state roads. With new categorisation, M-6 highway was renamed as M-7 highway.

Major intersections

References

M-7